Rabila frontalis, the red bollworm, is a moth of the family Noctuidae. The species was first described by Francis Walker in 1865. It is found in India and Sri Lanka.

Its larval food plant is cotton. Larvae are parasitized by Bracon species.

References

Moths of Asia
Moths described in 1865
Hadeninae